Nigma puella is a species of spider belonging to the family Dictynidae. It is found in Europe, Azores, Madeira, Canary Islands and parts of North Africa.

Like most members of the family, this is a small spider but the female is striking, with a light green abdomen marked with a bold maroon blotch and a variable amount of barring in the same colour. The male is reddish brown. This species makes a horizontal web over the top surface of a leaf.

References 

 
  (2008): The world spider catalog, version 8.5. American Museum of Natural History.

External links 
Pictures of N. puella

Dictynidae
Arthropods of the Azores
Arthropods of Madeira
Spiders of the Canary Islands
Spiders of Africa
Spiders described in 1870
Spiders of Europe